Benny Nemer (formerly Benny Nemerofsky Ramsay; born September 25, 1973) is a Montreal-born artist and diarist based in Paris, France.

Since 2000 his work has mediated emotional encounters with musical, art historical, and queer cultural material, encouraging deep listening and empathic viewing. Early video work concentrated on critical mimicry of material from popular culture, with references to Madonna, American Idol, Tatu, Françoise Hardy and Kylie Minogue. Recent work focuses on re-examinations of seminal texts, films and video art from queer and art history, working with material by Hervé Guibert, Colin Campbell, Rosa von Praunheim, and Harry Hay.

His work has exhibited internationally, including solo exhibitions at the Tiroler Kunstpavillon (Innsbruck), Dazibao Centre de Photographies Actuelles (Montreal), and the Staatsbibliothek (Stuttgart); and numerous group exhibitions including the Frankfurter Kunstverein (Frankfurt), The Power Plant Gallery of Contemporary Art (Toronto), Kunsthallen Nikolaj (Copenhagen), the Schwules Museum (Berlin), and the Red Brick House (Yokohama), among others. Nemer's video work has screened in festivals and galleries across Canada, Europe and East Asia and has won prizes at the Hamburg Short Film Festival, the Kasseler Dokumentarfilm und Videofest and the Kurzfilmtage Oberhausen (all in Germany), the Toronto Inside Out Film and Video Festival as well as first prize at the Globalica Media Arts Biennale in Wrocław, Poland. His work is part of numerous private collections as well as the permanent collection of the National Gallery of Canada, the Kunsthistorisches Museum Vienna and Thiel Gallery, Stockholm.

His works include an unconventional audioguide for POLIN Museum of the History of Polish Jews in Warsaw, which starts by telling visitors to leave the museum, and then spins a mix of folklore, truth, and lies about Warsaw.

Nemer completed a practice-led PhD at the Edinburgh College of Art in 2019, where he was part of Cruising the 70s: Unearthing Pre-HIV/AIDS Queer Sexual Cultures, a three-year research project led by art historians, cultural anthropologists, and artists in Germany, Poland, Spain, and the United Kingdom. His doctoral research critically examined the museum audio guide as a media form, turning to queer theory and contemporary museum mediation practice to expand and critically reimagine its potential.

Nemer is a post-doctoral researcher at Royal Academy of Fine Arts (KASK) in Ghent, Belgium.

In 2021, Benny Nemer changed his name from Benny Nemerofsky Ramsay.

References

External links
 Official Site
 Cruising the 70s: Unearthing Pre-HIV/AIDS Queer Sexual Cultures

1973 births
Artists from Montreal
Canadian contemporary artists
Canadian video artists
Canadian gay artists
Living people
21st-century Canadian LGBT people